Suzanne Müller (-Nelson) (born February 15, 1963 in Interlaken, Bern) is a Swiss rhythmic gymnast.

Müller competed for Switzerland in the rhythmic gymnastics individual all-around competition at the 1984 Summer Olympics in Los Angeles. There she tied for 28th place in the preliminary (qualification) round and did not advance to the final.

References

External links 
 Susanne Mueller at Sports-Reference.com

1963 births
Living people
Swiss rhythmic gymnasts
Gymnasts at the 1984 Summer Olympics
Olympic gymnasts of Switzerland
People from Interlaken
Sportspeople from the canton of Bern